General elections were held in Malta on 24 and 25 September 1889.

Background
The elections were held under the Knutsford Constitution. Ten members were elected from single-member constituencies, whilst a further four members were elected to represent nobility and landowners, graduates, clerics and the Chamber of Commerce.

Results
A total of 9,777 people were registered to vote, of which just 3,383 cast votes, giving a turnout of 35%. Sigismondo Savona won constituencies I and II, resulting in a by-election for district II in November in which Saverio DePirlo was elected.

References

1889
Malta
1889 in Malta
September 1889 events